A twip (abbreviating "twentieth of a point", "twentieth of an inch point", or "twentieth of an Imperial point" ) is a typographical measurement, defined as  of a typographical point. One twip is  inch, or 17.64 μm.

In computing 
Twips are screen-independent units to ensure that the proportion of screen elements are the same on all display systems. A twip is defined as being  of an inch (approximately 0.01764 mm).

A pixel is a screen-dependent unit, standing for 'picture element'. A pixel is a dot that represents the smallest graphical measurement on a screen.
Twips are the default unit of measurement in Visual Basic (version 6 and earlier, prior to VB.NET). Converting between twips and screen pixels is achieved using the TwipsPerPixelX and TwipsPerPixelY properties or the ScaleX and ScaleY methods.

Twips can be used with Symbian OS bitmap images for automatic scaling from bitmap pixels to device pixels. They are also used in Rich Text Format from Microsoft for platform-independent exchange and they are the base length unit in OpenOffice.org and its fork LibreOffice.

See also
Himetric

References 

 MSDN Library — com.ms.wfc.ui.CoordinateSystem.TWIP
 Free On-Line Dictionary of Computing — twip
 Foundation, ActionScript 3.0 Animation, Making Things Move! by Keith Peters  (pbk)
 Converting between twips and pixels - Ruby code

Typography
Units of length